Mike Darrington (born 13 September 1931) is an English former professional snooker player.

Career
As an amateur, Darrington was the Home Counties snooker champion seven times, and defeated Steve Davis in the 1978 English Amateur Championship. He also won the first Zimbabwe Open in November 1981. He turned professional in 1982. His only professional tournament in his first season was the 1983 World Championship; he faced Rex Williams in the first qualifying round, and lost 0–10.

During the next season, Darrington recorded the best performance his time as a professional would bring, in reaching the last 48 at the 1983 International Open. There, he defeated Ian Williamson 5–3 before losing 2–5 to Silvino Francisco. At the non-ranking 1985 English Professional Championship he was whitewashed 0–9 by John Virgo in his first match. Although he reached his highest ranking, 78th, for the 1986/1987 season, Darrington rarely made any progress in qualifying for events, and won only one match in the 1993–94 snooker season. He did not compete on the main tour thereafter.

References

English snooker players
1931 births
Living people